Captain Salvation may refer to:

Captain Salvation, a novel by Frederick William Wallace
Captain Salvation (film), a 1927 film adaptation of the novel